Minuscule 2464 (in the Gregory-Aland numbering), is a Greek minuscule manuscript of the New Testament, on 213 parchment leaves. Dated palaeographically to the 9th century. The text is written in one column per page, in 26 lines per page.

Description 
The codex contains the text of the Acts of the Apostles, General epistles, and Pauline epistles with considerable lacunae. 52 leaves were damaged by water.

The Greek text of the codex is a representative of the Alexandrian text-type. The basic text is the late Alexandrian, with some Byzantine text-type readings. The Romans is almost purely Byzantine. It has 6956 textual variants. Kurt Aland placed it in Category II.

The codex currently is housed at the Monastery of Saint John the Theologian (Ms. 742), in Patmos.

See also 
 List of New Testament minuscules
 Textual criticism

References

Further reading 

 F. J. Leroy, Le Patmos St Jean 742 (Gregory 2464), Utrecht 1973.

External links

Article 

 Manuscript 2464 at the Encyclopedia of Textual Criticism

Text 

 Billy R. Todd, Collation of the Codex 2464

Greek New Testament minuscules
9th-century biblical manuscripts